The men's 400 metres was the third-shortest of the men's track races in the Athletics at the 1964 Summer Olympics program in Tokyo.  It was held on 17 October, 18 October, and 19 October 1964.  55 athletes from 36 nations entered, with 5 not starting in the first round. The first two rounds were held on 17 October, with the semifinals on 18 October and the final on 19 October. The maximum number of athletes per nation had been set at 3 since the 1930 Olympic Congress. The event was won by Mike Larrabee of the United States, the third consecutive and tenth overall victory for an American in the event. Trinidad and Tobago and Poland each earned their first medal in the 400 metres.

Background

This was the fifteenth appearance of the event, which is one of 12 athletics events to have been held at every Summer Olympics. None of the finalists from 1960 returned. The United States again had a strong team; Henry Carr would have been favored, but ran only in the 200 metres and the 4 × 400 metres relay. Ulis Williams was the 1962 and 1963 AAU champion, but Mike Larrabee matched the world record to win the U.S. Olympic trials. Other contenders included 1962 European champion Robbie Ian Brightwell of Great Britain and Wendell Mottley of Trinidad and Tobago.

Hong Kong, Iran, the Ivory Coast, Senegal, and Tanzania appeared in this event for the first time. South Korea and Mongolia had entrants, but did not start. The United States made its fifteenth appearance in the event, the only nation to compete in it at every Olympic Games to that point.

Competition format

The competition retained the basic four-round format from 1920. A significant change, however, was the introduction of the "fastest loser" system. Previously, advancement depended solely on the runners' place in their heat. The 1964 competition added advancement places to the fastest runners across the heats in the first round who did not advance based on place. The 1964 event also increased the standard heat size to 8 athletes.

There were 7 heats in the first round, each scheduled to have 7 or 8 athletes but with one dropping to as low as 5 after withdrawals. The top four runners in each heat advanced to the quarterfinals, along with the next four fastest runners overall. There were 4 quarterfinals of 8 runners each; the top four athletes in each quarterfinal heat advanced to the semifinals. The semifinals featured 2 heats of 8 runners each. The top four runners in each semifinal heat advanced, making an eight-man final.

Records

Prior to the competition, the existing World and Olympic records were as follows.

No records were set during this event.

Schedule

All times are Japan Standard Time (UTC+9)

Results

First round

The top four runners in each of the 7 heats advanced.

Heat 1

Heat 2

Heat 3

Heat 4

Heat 5

Heat 6

Heat 7

Quarterfinals

The four fastest runners in each of the four heats advanced to the semifinals.

Quarterfinal 1

Quarterfinal 2

Quarterfinal 3

Quarterfinal 4

Semifinals

The top four runners in each of the two semifinals advanced to the final.

Semifinal 1

Semifinal 2

Final

References

Athletics at the 1964 Summer Olympics
400 metres at the Olympics
Men's events at the 1964 Summer Olympics